Remote Access is a Russian drama film  directed by  . It was nominated for the Golden Lion award at the 61st Venice International Film Festival.

Cast
 Dana Agisheva as Zhenya
  as Vera, Zhenya's mother
 Vladimir Ilyin as Timofey, Vera's friend
 Aleksandr Plaksin as Sergey
 Fyodor Lavrov as Igor
 Sergey Dreyden as Sergey's father
 Igor Zolotovitsky as Andrey

References

External links

 Remote Access at the KinoPoisk
  

Russian drama films
2004 drama films
2004 films
Gorky Film Studio films